Elachista sutteri is a moth of the family Elachistidae that can be found in Greece and Cyprus.

References

sutteri
Moths described in 2002
Moths of Europe